Evert van Linge (19 November 1895 – 6 December 1964) was a Dutch footballer who earned 13 caps for the Dutch national side between 1919 and 1926, scoring three goals. He also participated at the 1924 Summer Olympics. He played for Be Quick 1887 and SC Veendam.

He was an architect and designed football club Be Quick 1887's Stadion Esserberg.

References

External links
 Player profile at VoetbalStats.nl

1895 births
1964 deaths
Dutch footballers
Netherlands international footballers
Olympic footballers of the Netherlands
Footballers at the 1920 Summer Olympics
Footballers at the 1924 Summer Olympics
Olympic medalists in football
Olympic bronze medalists for the Netherlands
People from Veendam
SC Veendam players
Be Quick 1887 players
Association football midfielders
Medalists at the 1920 Summer Olympics
Footballers from Groningen (province)